Medicago turbinata or Southern medick is a plant species of the genus Medicago It is found throughout the Mediterranean basin. It forms a symbiotic relationship with the bacterium Sinorhizobium medicae, which is capable of nitrogen fixation. An unidentified lectin isolated from M. turbinata has shown limited usefulness as a phytohaemagglutinin. The seed weight is 4.66 pounds.

Gallery

References

turbinata
Flora of Western Asia
Flora of North Africa